"Take Me Home" is a song by English singer and songwriter Jess Glynne. It was released on 3 November 2015 as the fifth single from her debut studio album, I Cry When I Laugh (2015). A music video for the song was released on Glynne's Facebook page on 30 October. "Take Me Home" has peaked at number 4 on the Scottish Singles Chart as well as number 6 on the UK Singles Chart; it was also the BBC Children in Need single of 2015.

The song was met with highly positive critical reception, with critics commending Glynne's songwriting and vocals throughout the song further calling it as a stand-out from the album. It is Glynne's biggest solo hit in Italy, and also her second Top 5 there, being certified 3× Platinum.

Music video
The official music video for the song, lasting four minutes and thirty-three seconds, was released on Glynne's Facebook page on 30 October 2015. It was given the partner rating of 15 on YouTube. Described as both "intimate" and "powerful", the video features several scenes of Glynne nude, singing to the camera and curling up in a chair. Glynne commented on the video's release, saying "Finally... I can show you all the video for "Take Me Home" – I'm so pleased and nervous that it's finally out. This is a song about the need to have someone who cares when you are at your most vulnerable. It's an emotional song for me and I have to admit it brought me to tears filming the video, not because I was sad but because I was so grateful that I had someone to get me out of the dark hole I was in."

Track listing

Charts

Weekly charts

Year-end charts

Certifications

Release history

References

2015 singles
2015 songs
Children in Need singles
Jess Glynne songs
Pop ballads
Soul ballads
Songs written by Steve Mac
Songs written by Wayne Hector
Atlantic Records singles
Songs written by Jess Glynne
Song recordings produced by Steve Mac